was a village located in Higashichikuma District, Nagano Prefecture, Japan.

As of 2003, the village had an estimated population of 2,139 and a density of 71.85 persons per km². The total area was 29.77 km².

On October 11, 2005, Sakakita, along with the villages of Honjō and Sakai (all from Higashichikuma District), was merged to create the village of Chikuhoku.

Dissolved municipalities of Nagano Prefecture
Chikuhoku, Nagano